Martynas Džiaugys (born 8 November 1986) is a Lithuanian rower.

In 2016 European championships he won silver with Lithuanian quadruple sculls team. He was also selected to the national team to represent Lithuania in 2016 Summer Olympics.

References

External links
 
 
 
 
 

1986 births
Living people
Lithuanian male rowers
Rowers at the 2016 Summer Olympics
Rowers at the 2020 Summer Olympics
Olympic rowers of Lithuania
World Rowing Championships medalists for Lithuania